The Martin/General Dynamics RB-57F Canberra is a specialized strategic reconnaissance aircraft developed in the 1960s for the United States Air Force by General Dynamics from the Martin B-57 Canberra tactical bomber, which itself was a license-built version of the English Electric Canberra. It was operationally assigned to the Air Weather Service for weather reconnaissance involving high-altitude atmospheric sampling and radiation detection in support of nuclear test monitoring, but four of the 21 modified aircraft performed solely as strategic reconnaissance platforms in Japan and Germany.

Three of the modified aircraft were destroyed with the loss of their crews while performing operationally. The remainder were re-designated WB-57F in 1968. 
Four of the survivors were subsequently used by NASA for high-altitude atmospheric research. The others were retired from 1972 to 1974 and placed in storage.

, three WB-57Fs are the only B-57 aircraft model still flying, in service with NASA.

Design and development
The RB-57F was the result of an Air Force Big Safari requirement for a high-altitude reconnaissance platform with better performance than the existing and similar RB-57D, some of which had been grounded as a result of wing spar failures. A more urgent need to field an aircraft capable of high altitude signals intelligence arose in 1962 when a SIGINT operation conducted by United States Navy against the Soviet Union from Peshawar, Pakistan, ended abruptly because the Pakistani government evicted the Navy for committing too many violations of restricted airspace. Two B-57Bs dubbed "Pee Wee 1" and "Pee Wee 2" were quickly modified by Big Safari with antennas and a modular telemetry receiver suite packaged in a pressurized canister and sent to Pakistan in January 1963 as an interim measure under an operation named Little Cloud to continue the mission. In the meantime Big Safari  authorized the Pee Wee III project to develop the new high-altitude platform from existing B-57s. Because General Dynamics was responsible for contract maintenance on the D model, its Fort Worth Division was given the sole-source contract for the development of the Pee Wee III RB-57F prototypes.

The two aircraft chosen for initial development were Martin B-57Bs 52-1559 and 53-3864, which supplied the fuselage and horizontal stabilizers around which the rebuild was made. The prototype RB-57Fs incorporated many major changes from the RB-57D, the most obvious of which was an enlarged computer-designed wing to enable it to operate at extreme altitudes. Extensive use was made of aluminum honeycomb wing panels in the wings that bonded outer and inner aluminum skins to a honeycomb of aluminum and fiberglass. All control surfaces had tightly sealed gaps in order to reduce drag, and there were no wing flaps. In addition, the size of the empennage was redesigned so that the vertical stabilizer had nearly twice the area of that of the standard B-57B.

Another obvious change was the replacement of the Wright J65 turbojets with Pratt & Whitney TF33-P-11 turbofan engines. The TF33s gave the aircraft more than double the thrust of the B model. The RB-57F was also fitted with two detachable Pratt & Whitney J60-P-9 turbojets mounted in pods attached to the wings outboard of the main engines. These auxiliary engines were air-started and only for use at altitude in flight.

To perform their Pakistani mission, the two prototypes were equipped with high-gain phased array antennas in their wingtips, an extended radome, and a canister package developed by HRB-Singer known as "System 365" installed in the bomb bay. The size of two  drums, System 365 was a semi-automatic signal collection system that used 12 continuously scanning receivers and had a manual fixed-frequency coverage capability with pre-selected frequencies. The system automatically recorded up to six hours of collected signals on tape.

The extensive modifications of Pee Wee III resulted in virtually a new aircraft and new serial numbers for fiscal year 1963 were assigned to the 21 modified aircraft.

Testing and production

The first test flight of the RB-57F prototype was conducted on 23 June 1963 at Edwards Air Force Base, California. The prototype showed remarkable power, reaching   in 18 minutes with a steady rate of climb of 2,725 f/min (831 m/min). Its RB-57D chase plane was unable to match it in maneuverability. The wing design created tremendous lift even at idle speeds; the aircraft was airborne after a takeoff roll of only   at sea level. Because of this it also proved difficult to land, and if an engine failed during takeoff, TF33 main engine thrust was limited to 70% power to maintain directional control. Despite some shortcomings the design had shown exceptional performance and Big Safari authorized the First Chip production program in August 1963 for the fabrication of 19 more RB-57Fs from existing B-57 airframes.

They also flew reconnaissance missions over the Baltic Sea. They returned to the United States in February 1964 and were assigned to the 58th Weather Reconnaissance Squadron at Kirtland Air Force Base, New Mexico. High altitude flights required the wearing of David Clark Company A/P22S-2 and later A/P22S-4 full pressure suits, and crew pre-flight preparations were similar to those used by U-2 and SR-71 crews.

The initial run of 12 aircraft for the First Chip program were converted from the 1952/1953 serial blocks of B-57B aircraft still on active duty, including the two sent to Pakistan as "Pee Wee 1" and "Pee Wee 2". They were delivered one a month through 1964; the last (First Chip 12 and formerly "Pee Wee 2") was retained as a test bed in Fort Worth. The next four conversions were to RB-57Ds that were taken out of storage under a follow-up program called Second Slice, delivered between April 1965 and February 1966. The final three were converted from RB-57A aircraft and delivered in March 1967. The converted RB-57As differed from earlier First Chip conversions by the addition of a Mk III Impact Probe in the bomb bay. In March 1968 the 63-13286 prototype was also upgraded to the First Chip standard and the two phases renamed in accordance with newly established Big Safari nomenclature that required two-word code names beginning with "Rivet." The First Chip aircraft were renamed Rivet Chip and the Second Slice as Rivet Slice.

The production aircraft were further modified with new TF33-P-11A engines that delivered even greater thrust than those of the prototypes. Foil systems developed in 1962 for the WC-130B to collect particulate debris from nuclear tests were installed in the bomb bay and the fuselage beside the cockpit. The wings had four hard points on which to mount the J60 engines and air particulate sampling pods, a gaseous sampling system was housed in the fuselage, and a KA-56 downward-looking panoramic camera mounted in the nose. Two aircraft were additionally modified to carry the Bulova 707-1000 long range camera, which had a 240-inch (6096mm) focal length that resulted in its reference designation of Big Item. These high-altitude side-looking cameras, secured by a roll-stabilized mount, could take oblique shots at 5 to 15 degrees below the horizon up to  range from the aircraft and provide 30-inch (76 cm) high resolution images. The electronics were also updated on the standard F model. The nose of the aircraft was lengthened to house sophisticated navigational equipment along with sensitive detection equipment for gathering SIGINT/ELINT intelligence. The cockpit was provided with a modified Lear MC-1 autopilot. The average cost of each RB-57F conversion approximated $1.5 million.

Operational history

Weather reconnaissance
The official mission of the RB-57F was weather reconnaissance, and all RB-57Fs were assigned to meteorological units of the 9th Weather Reconnaissance Wing, Air Weather Service, Military Air Transport Service, headquartered at McClellan Air Force Base, California:
 55th Weather Reconnaissance Squadron, McClellan AFB, California
 56th Weather Reconnaissance Squadron, Yokota AB, Japan
 57th Weather Reconnaissance Squadron, Avalon Airport, Avalon, Victoria, Australia
 58th Weather Reconnaissance Squadron, Kirtland AFB, New Mexico.

Air Weather Service RB-57Fs duties involved high-altitude atmospheric sampling and radiation detection work in support of nuclear test monitoring, mostly on behalf of the Atomic Energy Commission, including collection of airborne debris in a program of ongoing monitoring of nuclear tests. Most of this activity was centered on nuclear tests carried out in People's Republic of China, but monitoring air in the aftermath of U.S. underground nuclear tests was also conducted. One RB-57F is known to have been used for research into airborne laser equipment by the Air Force Logistics Command research laboratory at Kirtland AFB. In 1968, the Air Weather Service's RB-57Fs were redesignated WB-57F.

Strategic reconnaissance

Military Air Transport Service (and its successor organization Military Airlift Command) was frequently used by the USAF for clandestine, special operations missions prior to the establishment of Air Force Special Operations Command in the 1980s. The RB-57F, with its extreme high-altitude ceiling was frequently used as a strategic reconnaissance platform. The four Rivet Slice aircraft (converted from RB-57D airframes) were equipped with covertly mounted cameras and assigned specifically to reconnaissance work in 1965, Rivet Slice 2 and 3 with the 6091st Reconnaissance Squadron at Yokota AB and Rivet Slice 1 and 4 with the 7407th Support Squadron at Rhein-Main AB.

The RB-57F prototypes (63-13286 and 63-13287) developed under the Pee Wee III program were detached from the 58th WRS after operational testing and evaluation and sent to Pakistan to replace "Pee Wee 1" and "Pee Wee 2" in Little Cloud. The Indo-Pakistani War of 1965 began while Pee Wee III aircraft No. 2 was out of the country and No. 1 was operated by 24 Squadron of the Pakistan Air Force.   Older accounts of the Little Cloud operation give the original reason for the RB-57F deployment to Pakistan as being the monitoring of Communist Chinese nuclear tests, which began in October 1964. The aircraft were said to have been flown by USAF crews during these operations, and one of the RB-57Fs was reported to have returned to its U.S. base before the outbreak of hostilities with India while the other remained.

The RB-57F was also said to have been locally modified by the PAF to carry a  bombload, but never actually operated in a bombing role. On other occasions, the RB-57F was accompanied by a pair of PAF B-57B Canberra bombers (apparently the Rivet Flash configurations sold to Pakistan in 1959 as standard B-57s but modified in 1964 under a pre-agreement of sale to enable them to track Indian mobile radars) that were jamming Indian military radio transmissions.

All three aircraft were involved in directing attacks on an Indian radar station at Amritsar, and during these operations, one of the PAF B-57Bs was shot down in error by Pakistani Anti-Aircraft Artillery. The account goes on to state that on 15 September 1965, RB-57F 63-13286 was straddled by two SA-2 SAMs as it commenced its descent towards Peshawar. Despite the plane's suffering major structural damage and sustaining over 170 holes, the pilot managed to nurse the aircraft back to Peshawar, where he made a successful forced landing. The aircraft was eventually repaired and returned to the USAF.

However, in a newer history by a retired Big Safari commander published in 2014, some of the earlier account is refuted as erroneous. The Pee Wee III aircraft arrived in Pakistan in March 1964, well before the Chinese nuclear tests began, not for monitoring the tests since the aircraft were not yet equipped with the sampling equipment, camera, or sensors of the standard RB-57Fs, but to collect telemetry from Soviet missile test ranges, particularly Kapustin Yar. The aircraft were both flown and maintained by members of the Pakistan Air Force, not the U.S. Air Force, a condition mandated by the Pakistanis. The RB-57F prototypes, with the required capability of being a type that PAF airmen could fly, had been purpose-built with the telemetry mission as its goal, and the modification for carrying a two-ton payload in the bomb bay had been made by General Dynamics as part of its development, not by the PAF. From April to October 1965 the two RB-57s each underwent an annual three-month depot maintenance recycle at the General Dynamics plant in Fort Worth required by Big Safari rules, which was where Pee Wee III No. 2 was when the air war began on 1 September 1965.

One member of the USAF crew sent by the Big Safari office to retrieve the damaged RB-57 doubts that the aircraft was used in the role described as its sensors were tailored specifically for the telemetry mission and of no value in combat, and that it operated in an area away from Indian airspace. The damage itself was largely superficial, not structural. Instead he states that he was told that the aircraft was damaged during an IAF air raid on its airfield on 7 September. It had been kept in the air as much as possible to protect it from attack but was damaged during a refueling turnaround. The damaged aircraft was returned to the United States to protect it from further harm and to process the sensitive collected data, which the Pakistanis did not have the capability of doing. Both aircraft were reassigned to the 7407th Support Squadron when 63-13287 emerged from its depot recycle. The Rivet Flash B-57 was overflying a Pakistani radar site at Rahwali,  from Amritsar, when it was shot down on 11 September 1965 by its own AAA, mistaken for an IAF Canberra. The death of the PAF squadron leader flying it, who was the key Pakistani member of the Little Cloud operation, precipitated the rapid exit from Pakistan of the RB-57Fs.

The newer information is supported by the fate of 63-13287. On 14 December 1965, operating TDY from Incirlik Air Base in Turkey as "Big Rib 06", it disappeared during a mission over the Black Sea whose route passed through telemetry range for Soviet ICBMs. What actually happened is still uncertain. There was speculation that the aircraft had been shot down by a Soviet S-75 Dvina (NATO designation "SA-2 Guideline") surface-to-air missile, but the official statement by the USAF was that the aircraft was on its third pass along its route when it deviated from its flight plan, orbiting and spiraling down to below minimum radar tracking altitude, indicating that the aircraft crew had probably perished from an oxygen system failure. Although searches for the wreckage continued until 28 December, only small bits and pieces of it were recovered, although unsubstantiated reports asserted that the two crew members had been captured alive by the Soviets. However one of the recovered pieces was an inner wing panel that a team of structural experts concluded was struck by an object, likely a missile. The crew was declared dead after being missing for six months. The Soviets used the incident to argue successfully against U.S. intelligence-gathering missions originating from Turkish air bases.

U.S. Air Force retirement
Single- and double-engine engine flameouts plagued the program between June 1965 and July 1967, when fuel control problems were finally corrected. No aircraft were destroyed but one was out of service for six months after it crash-landed in a field near Albuquerque. By May 1968 stress cracks began appearing in the wing spars and ribs of all the RB-57Fs outboard of the main engines and numerous groundings forced the cancellation of many operational missions. Some aircraft were sent to General Dynamics for repairs but under Big Safari dicta the cost of repairing all of the aircraft was excessive and resulted in five being placed in storage at Davis-Monthan AFB in 1972 and another three in 1973. The remaining aircraft were retired in 1974. Each had accumulated on average a total of 3,000 hours of airframe life. The 58th WRS, the last squadron in the Air Force to use the WB-57F, was inactivated on 1 July 1974.

Three RB-57Fs were lost in operational service. Rivet Chip 10 (63-13297) crashed on 7 November 1966 when it descended below its assigned altitude while on Instrument Flight Rules during a night approach to Kirtland AFB in bad weather and struck the summit of Sandia Crest. On 27 June 1972 Rivet Chip 5 (63-13292) disintegrated when it entered a "Mach tuck" above an altitude of  near Albuquerque. The crews of both Rivet Chips were killed. The third loss, that of the second prototype, was possibly a Cold War casualty, also with loss of crew.

NASA

The Rivet Chip and Rivet Slice aircraft have been used by NASA in support of various research programs. NASA first provided funding to modify and operate RB-57F 63-13501 to support the Earth Resources Satellite Program, with modifications taking place at Fort Worth between 26 September 1968 and 14 July 1969 as Project Rivet Rap. Flying as NASA 925 and known as "ESA (Earth Survey Aircraft) No. 3", the WB-57F was used as a flying testbed for the evaluation of multispectral sensors in a "near-space" environment to collect data to be correlated with similar data collected at low altitude and on the ground. The Air Force contracted with NASA to provide the aircraft on the condition that its sensor package be easily removed to reconfigure the aircraft quickly for its national security mission if necessary. The Rivet Rap was therefore modified to carry aerodynamically faired, plug-in pallets developed by General Dynamics to house both NASA and Air Force primary mission equipment. These pallets fit into the bomb bay and connected with existing electrical and cooling outlets, and had removable operating consoles that could be fitted into the back seat station in the cockpit.

In 1972, the high cost to the Air Force of supporting the ESA No. 3 operation became prohibitive and the aircraft was transferred permanently to NASA. Two other WB-57Fs were transferred with the inactivation of the 58th WRS and eventually all those in NASA service were issued FAA civil registrations. They are designated the NASA High Altitude Research Project at the Johnson Space Center in Houston, Texas, and operate from Ellington Field JRB. Three of the four WB-57F aircraft used by NASA remain in operational service with registries expiring in 2021 or 2022, conducting a variety of civil tasks worldwide: 

N925NA (NASA 925), AF s/n 63-13501 (Rivet Slice 3 and Rivet Rap), retired 15 September 1982
N926NA (NASA 926), AF s/n 63-13503 (Rivet Slice 2), registry expires 31 August 2025
N927NA (NASA 927), AF s/n 63-13295 (Rivet Chip 8), registry expires 31 July 2025
N928NA (NASA 928), AF s/n 63-13298 (Rivet Chip 11), registry expires 30 June 2024

For NASA operations, the aircraft often carry a three-ton (2,700 kg) data-gathering sensor pallet in the former bomb-bay underneath the center fuselage that can include the Airborne Remote Earth Sensing (ARES) instrument to calibrate satellite data, a combined hyperspectral imager/radiometer with a two-dimensional focal plane array, and a variety of cameras.  During the Space Shuttle program, the aircraft were equipped with a special high-definition camera and other sensors in a specially adapted gimbal-mounted ball turret mounted in the nose, known as the WB-57F Ascent Video Experiment (WAVE) to track and video Space Shuttle launches and recoveries from high altitude.

On 10 October 2005, NASA 928 flew from Ellington Field via CFB Goose Bay, Newfoundland and Labrador to RAF Mildenhall in Suffolk, England arriving during the evening of 11 October 2005. The Cosmic Dust Collector (CDC) mission uses two small metallic rectangular boxes carried under each wing that are designed to open at altitude and collect "interplanetary dust particles", or in other words the remains of small meteorites or rocks from space that accumulate in the upper atmosphere, on an adhesive strip. At the end of the assigned track the boxes then automatically close at high altitude and after landing the adhesive strip is removed and returned to the U.S. for analysis. The missions also allowed the WB-57F crews to validate new radios and avionics and ensure these could interface correctly with European ATC agencies. There was also an unconfirmed report that the aircraft also supported a UK MoD assessment of future sensors for UAV applications in a European environment by carrying the sensors in its pallet under the fuselage.

In August 2006, NASA 928 arrived at RAF Mildenhall totally devoid of all the usual identification marks, particularly serial numbers or NASA logos.  The only insignia were a small U.S. flag on the tail fin and some even smaller flags beneath the cockpit on the port side. The lack of insignia possibly indicated that the aircraft was operating on behalf of another U.S. government agency. After some local sorties, possibly to test the onboard equipment, the aircraft departed to Kandahar Airport, Afghanistan via NSA Souda Bay, Crete. The aircraft then flew a number of sorties out of Kandahar, presumably carrying a classified sensor package and returned to Ellington Field via Souda Bay and Mildenhall.

Officially, the aircraft performed geophysical and remote sensing surveys in 2007 for a coalition of scientists created by the Department of Defense representing the U.S. Geological Survey, the Afghanistan Ministry of Mines and Petroleum, and the Task Force for Business and Stability Operations (TFBSO), as part of the U.S. aid to the Afghan reconstruction effort. Through 28 missions, the WB-57 collected AVIRIS (Airborne Visible / InfraRed Imaging Spectrometer) data that could be analyzed to provide information on mineral assemblages that could aid in resource and hazards assessments.

An updated HALOE package has subsequently been installed in a Bombardier Global Express BD-700 business jet.

Reports surfaced in March 2011 that NASA 926 was observed performing flights from Nellis AFB testing a new sensor package being carried in its pallet system payload bay over the period from 15 November 2011 until 1 February 2012. Although the reason for the deployment to the Nellis Test and Training Ranges (NTTR) was unknown, it was linked to testing sensors within the NTTR. Since both NASA 926 and 928 have carried BACN (Battlefield Airborne Communications Node) payloads in Afghanistan performing network-centric warfare missions, it was speculated that the Canberra was testing new sensors and antennas used by BACN to relay communications between command and control centers and ground troops located within valleys and ridges in the Afghanistan mountains.

NASA 927 joined the fleet after being taken out of AMARG storage at Davis-Monthan AFB.  The aircraft started its service life as B-57B s/n 53-3918 as a night intruder with the 8th Tactical Bomb Squadron and then was rebuilt as RB-57F 63-13295 in 1964. The aircraft was retired to the then MASDC on 26 June 1972 and remained at the AMARC or AMARG until May 2011.  The aircraft was then dismantled and trucked to Sierra Nevada Corporation (SNC) at Centennial Airport, Colorado where it was refurbished to flying condition and flown to Ellington AFB on 9 August 2013. The aircraft was turned over to NASA and re-designated NASA 927. NASA 927 is now the longest aircraft held in extended storage (41 years) before being returned to flight status.

Operators

 United States Air Force
 National Aeronautics and Space Administration
 National Center for Atmospheric Research
 National Oceanic and Atmospheric Administration

Republic of China Air Force 

 Pakistan Air Force
No. 24 Squadron "Blinders"

Specifications

Survivors
Operational

WB-57F
63-13503 (N926NA) – National Aeronautics and Space Administration, Houston, Texas.
63-13295 (N927NA) – National Aeronautics and Space Administration, Houston, Texas.
63-13298 (N928NA) – National Aeronautics and Space Administration, Houston, Texas.
On static display
WB-57F
63-13501 (N925NA) – Pima Air & Space Museum adjacent to Davis-Monthan AFB in Tucson, Arizona. (unrestored)

See also

References

Notes

Citations

Bibliography

 Fuller, John F. (1990). Thor's Legions: Weather Support to the U.S. Air Force and Army, 1937–1987. Boston, MA: American Meteorological Society. 
 Grimes, Col. William, USAF ret. (2014). The History of Big Safari. Bloomington, IN: Archway Publishing. 
 , Bruce (2005). English Electric Canberra: The History and Development of a Classic Jet. London: Pen & Sword Books. .
 Jackson, Robert (1989). Canberra: The Operational Record. Washington, D.C.: Smithsonian Institution Press. .
 Jenkins, Dennis R. (2012). Dressing for Altitude: U.S. Aviation Pressure Suits, Wiley Post to Space Shuttle, NASA: U.S. Government Printing Office.  
 Mikesh, Robert C (1995). Martin B-57 Canberra: The Complete Record. Atglen, PA: Schiffer Publishing Ltd. .

External links
B-57 Still Going Strong at 59, Missions/Research feature,NASA.gov
NASA Airborne Science Program, NASA.gov
WB-57 Experimenter's Handbook, Aircraft Operations Division, March 2015 revision. nasa.gov

B-57F, R
RB-57
1960s United States military reconnaissance aircraft
Twinjets
Aircraft with auxiliary jet engines
Mid-wing aircraft
Aircraft first flown in 1963